Dalibor Bagarić (born February 7, 1980) is a Croatian former professional basketball player. He had a stint with the NBA's Chicago Bulls from 2000 to 2003.

Professional career
A 7'1" (2.17 m) center born in Munich, West Germany, Bagarić had averaged 18.3 points and 10.4 rebounds per game for the Croatian team Benston Zagreb before the Bulls selected him with the 24th pick in the 2000 NBA draft. Bagarić never averaged more than 2.6 points and 2.5 rebounds per game during his time with the Bulls.

He returned to Europe after the Bulls bought out his contract in 2003, and began playing for the Greek club Olympiacos. He played only 10 games with the Bulls during the 2002 - 2003 season, with his final NBA game ever being on April 15, 2003, in a 115 - 106 win over the Philadelphia 76ers. Bagarić played for 3 minutes and the only stat he recorded was 2 points.

In 2004, he moved to Italian club Fortitudo Bologna. In the summer of 2006, he transferred to CB Girona of the Spanish ACB league.
In September 2007 he returned to Fortitudo Bologna after signing on a one-year contract. In November 2010 he signed with Maroussi. At the beginning of the 2011–12 season, Bagarić signed with CB Valladolid, but left the club in late November, returning to Croatia and signing with Cedevita. In September 2012, he signed a one-month deal with Sporting Al Riyadi Beirut in Lebanon. In December 2012, he signed with the Lebanese club Amchit. In the 2013–14 season, he played for Étoile Sportive du Sahel in Tunisia,  KK Zabok in Croatia and Al-Ahli Benghazi in Libya. In 2014, he signed with Brose Baskets Bamberg of the Basketball Bundesliga where he signed on December 2, 2014, a contract extension.

On June 9, 2016, Bagarić announced his retirement.

National team career
With the junior national teams of Croatia, Bagarić won the gold medal at the 1996 FIBA Europe Under-18 Championship.

He was also a member of the senior Croatian national basketball team. He has played at the EuroBasket 2003 and EuroBasket 2005.

References

External links
ACB.com profile
Eurobasket.com profile
FIBA.com profile

1980 births
Living people
ABA League players
Brose Bamberg players
CB Girona players
CB Valladolid players
Centers (basketball)
Chicago Bulls draft picks
Chicago Bulls players
Croatian expatriate basketball people in Greece
Croatian expatriate basketball people in Italy
Croatian expatriate basketball people in Spain
Croatian expatriate basketball people in the United States
Étoile Sportive du Sahel basketball players
Croatian expatriate basketball people in Lebanon
Croatian expatriate basketball people in Tunisia
Fortitudo Pallacanestro Bologna players
German expatriate basketball people in Italy
German men's basketball players
German people of Croatian descent
KK Cedevita players
KK Cibona players
KK Zabok players
Liga ACB players
Maroussi B.C. players
National Basketball Association players from Croatia
Olympiacos B.C. players
Sportspeople from Munich
KK Dubrava players
Al Riyadi Club Beirut basketball players